was a Japanese domain of the Edo period.  It was associated with Izumo Province in modern-day Shimane Prefecture.

In the han system, Mori was a political and economic abstraction based on periodic cadastral surveys and projected agricultural yields.  In other words, the domain was defined in terms of kokudaka, not land area. This was different from the feudalism of the West.

History
The domain was ruled for the entirety of its history by a branch of the Matsudaira clan of Fukui.

List of daimyōs 
The hereditary daimyōs were head of the clan and head of the domain.

Matsudaira clan, 1677–1871 (shinpan; 10,000 koku)

Takamasa
Naotaka
Naokazu
Naomichi
Naoyuki
Naokiyo
Naokata
Naooki
Naoyori
Naotoshi

See also 
 List of Han
 Abolition of the han system

References

External links
 "Mori" at Edo 300 

Domains of Japan

ja:松江藩#母里藩